Kendall Bernell Hunter (born September 16, 1988) is a former American football running back. He played college football for Oklahoma State University, and earned consensus All-American honors.  The San Francisco 49ers selected him in the fourth round of the 2011 NFL Draft.

Early years
Hunter was born in Tyler, Texas. He attended John Tyler High School in Tyler, where he played football and ran track. In football, he rushed for 1,200 yards and 14 touchdowns as a senior. Considered a three-star recruit by Rivals.com, Hunter was listed as the No. 40 running back prospect in the nation. Hunter suffered a knee injury in high school that limited his potential suitors. Hunter was a first-team all-district selection following his junior season during which he rushed for 1,056 yards and twelve touchdowns.

He also competed in track & field. He was timed at 11.3 seconds in the 100 meter dash as a senior. He was also a member of the 4 × 100 m relay (41.58 s).

College career
While attending Oklahoma State University, Hunter played for coach Mike Gundy's Oklahoma State Cowboys football team from 2007 to 2010. He was the nation's seventh leading rusher with 119.6 yards per game, including nine 100-yard rushing games, in 2008. He led the Big 12 Conference in rushing by more than 30 yards per game. He was named a first-team All-American after his sophomore season in 2008, and was recognized as a consensus first-team All-American as a senior in 2010. As a senior, he was also a finalist for the Doak Walker award which was won by LaMichael James, his teammate with San Francisco until James's release in 2014.

College statistics

Professional career

San Francisco 49ers

Hunter was selected by the San Francisco 49ers in the fourth round (115th overall) in the 2011 NFL Draft.

Hunter received his first start of his NFL career in week 4 of the 2011 season against the Philadelphia Eagles. He rushed for 473 yards (with an average yard per carry of 4.2) and scored 2 touchdowns during the regular season in a backup role to starting running back Frank Gore. Late in the 2012 season Hunter was put on injured reserve with a torn Achilles.

Over the summer of 2013, Hunter reportedly rehabilitated at Cosumnes River College with physical therapist Weinshilboum according to a June 18 article in the Sacramento Bee. Hunter spent time performing parcour across the Cosumnes campus, Bee writer Yolanda Marie wrote. Hunter was activated off the physically unable to perform list on August 10, 2013, nearly  months after he partially tore his left Achilles.

On July 26, 2014, Hunter was carted off the field due to a knee injury. Later an MRI revealed that he tore his ACL. The 49ers later waived him on August 5. After clearing waivers, he was placed on the 49ers' injured reserve list.

New Orleans Saints 
On December 16, 2015, Hunter signed with the New Orleans Saints after starting running back Mark Ingram II was placed on injured reserve. On January 1, 2016, Hunter was placed on injured reserve.

Toronto Argonauts 
On March 1, 2017, Hunter signed with the Toronto Argonauts of the Canadian Football League (CFL). On June 2, 2017, Hunter announced his retirement from professional football.

NFL career statistics

References

External links

Oklahoma State Cowboys bio
San Francisco 49ers bio

1988 births
Living people
All-American college football players
American football running backs
Canadian football running backs
American players of Canadian football
Oklahoma State Cowboys football players
Players of American football from Texas
Sportspeople from Tyler, Texas
San Francisco 49ers players
New Orleans Saints players
Toronto Argonauts players